Amir Khan (born 3 September 1992) is a Guyanese cricketer. He played in three first-class matches for Guyana from 2011 to 2014.

See also
 List of Guyanese representative cricketers

References

External links
 

1992 births
Living people
Guyanese cricketers
Guyana cricketers